Asgari Bai (25 August 1918 – 9 August 2006) was an Indian Dhrupad singer. She was a recipient of Padma Shri, Tansen Samman, Academy Samman and Shikhar Samman.

Asgari Bai was born in Bijawar, Chhatarpur. She had come with her mother Nazeera Begum to Tikamgarh. She died on 9 August 2006.

Ashgari Bai (1998), an Indian documentary film directed by Priti Chandriani and Brahmanand S. Singh explores her life as an exponent of Dhrupad.

References

Sources
बुंदेलखंड दर्शन डोट कॉम- बुन्देलखण्ड की विस्तृत जानकारी
Dhrupad singer Asgari Bai dead
Dhrupad artiste Asgari Bai hospitalised
Award return over son fear

Recipients of the Padma Shri in arts
Singers from Madhya Pradesh
People from Chhatarpur
People from Tikamgarh
Hindustani singers
1918 births
2006 deaths
Recipients of the Sangeet Natak Akademi Award
20th-century Indian women singers
20th-century Indian singers
Women musicians from Madhya Pradesh